Elimar Fürstenberg (27 May 1910 – 10 July 1981) was a German politician of the Christian Social Union in Bavaria (CSU) and former member of the German Bundestag.

Life 
In the 1949 federal elections he was elected directly to the German Bundestag for the Bavarian Party in the Landshut constituency with 32.9% of the vote, and remained a member of the Bundestag until 1953. On 19 January 1951 he joined the CSU.

Literature

References

1910 births
1981 deaths
Members of the Bundestag for Bavaria
Members of the Bundestag 1949–1953
Members of the Bundestag for the Christian Social Union in Bavaria